Bartolomeu de Gusmão Airport  was a Brazilian airport built to handle the operations with the rigid airships Graf Zeppelin and Hindenburg. The airport was named after Bartolomeu Lourenço de Gusmão (1685–1724), a Portuguese priest born in Brazil who did research about transportation with balloons.

History

Between 1931 and 1937, Deutsche Luft Hansa had regular flights between Germany and Brazil, which were operated by Luftschiffbau Zeppelin using its rigid airships Graf Zeppelin and Hindenburg. Rio de Janeiro was the final stop, where passengers could connect with aircraft services to Southern Brazil, Uruguay, Argentina, Chile and Bolivia operated by Syndicato Condor, the Brazilian subsidiary of Deutsche Luft Hansa. During its five years of regular scheduled summer season intercontinental commercial airship service between Germany and South America, the hangar was used only nine times: four by the LZ-127 Graf Zeppelin and five by the LZ-129 Hindenburg. Assembled from parts brought from Germany, the construction was subsidized by the Brazilian government.

The airport was inaugurated on December 26, 1936 by President Getúlio Vargas, in the presence of the German Ambassador Schmidt Elskop. Before this, rigid airships were docked at Campo dos Afonsos.

The new airport consisted of an airfield, a hangar, a customs house, an office building, a radio-operations building, 5 bedrooms for workers, crew-lodgings, a work and storage house, a hydrogen factory, a plant to mix hydrogen with butane, and a branch line connecting the complex to the main railway line to downtown Rio de Janeiro 54 km away. The whole complex was built by the Luftschiffbau Zeppelin and are partially still in use by the Brazilian Air Force, which occupies the site.

The hangar is an original surviving example of a structure built to accommodate rigid airships and the only Zeppelin airship hangar which remains a hangar. Because of its historical importance, it was listed as a National Heritage Site on March 14, 1999.

As a consequence of the Hindenburg disaster on May 6, 1937 at Lakehurst Air Naval Station in New Jersey, US, the Luftschiffbau Zeppelin requested to the Brazilian Government on June 17, 1937 the suspension of services. After that no more civil operations were handled at this facility.

On February 12, 1942, six months before Brazil declared war against the Axis, the airport was taken over by the Brazilian Air Force Ministry and became a base of the Brazilian Air Force and therefore with exclusive military use. It is located in the neighborhood of Santa Cruz in the western region of Rio de Janeiro. The name of the facility was changed to Santa Cruz Air Force Base on January 16, 1943.

Access

See also
Santa Cruz Air Force Base

References

External links

Historical information
Flying Down to Rio on the Graf Zeppelin, an original short film on Youtube
Cultura Aeronáutica: Os Zeppelins nos céus brasileiros
Association Nationale des Amis du Musée de l'Aéronautique Navale
Musée de Tradition de l'Aéronautique navale
Airship Hangar Augusta
dernier Hangar à dirigeable

Defunct airports in Brazil
Airports established in 1936
Airports disestablished in 1942
Transport in Rio de Janeiro (city)
1936 establishments in Brazil
1942 disestablishments in Brazil